Lygiohypotyphla is a genus of flies in the family Pyrgotidae.

Species 
L. bicolor Steyskal, 1972
L. hyalipennis Vanschuytbroeck, 1963
L. nigripennis (Hendel, 1934)
L. ruwenzoriensis Vanschuytbroeck, 1963
L. saegeri Vanschuytbroeck, 1963

References 

Pyrgotidae
Diptera of Africa
Brachycera genera
Taxa named by Günther Enderlein